Amsterdam Township is one of sixteen townships in Hancock County, Iowa, USA.  As of the 2000 census, its population was 927.

Geography
According to the United States Census Bureau, Amsterdam Township covers an area of 35.84 square miles (92.83 square kilometers); of this, 35.78 square miles (92.68 square kilometers, 99.84 percent) is land and 0.06 square miles (0.15 square kilometers, 0.16 percent) is water.

Cities, towns, villages
 Kanawha

Adjacent townships
 Erin Township (north)
 Liberty Township (northeast)
 Twin Lake Township (east)
 Belmond Township, Wright County (southeast)
 Norway Township, Wright County (south)
 Boone Township, Wright County (southwest)
 Magor Township (west)
 Boone Township (northwest)

Cemeteries
The township contains these three cemeteries: New Amsterdam Township, Old Amsterdam and West Lake.

Major highways
  Iowa Highway 111

School districts
 West Hancock Community School District

Political districts
 Iowa's 4th congressional district
 State House District 12
 State Senate District 6

References
 United States Census Bureau 2008 TIGER/Line Shapefiles
 United States Board on Geographic Names (GNIS)
 United States National Atlas

External links
 US-Counties.com
 City-Data.com

Townships in Hancock County, Iowa
Townships in Iowa